The Great Briton Awards are an annual event to indicate who has made the greatest contribution to British life during the year. They were sponsored in 2004 by The Daily Telegraph, Morgan Stanley and the RSA. Nominations are based on a shortlist generated by asking the public to identify the candidates. The nominations are divided into seven categories:
 Arts
 Business
 Campaigning
 Creative Industries
 Public Service
 Science and Innovation
 Sport

with the top three contenders in each category going on to the next round.

The sponsors announced: Nominations were invited following a MORI survey commissioned by the RSA and conducted in Britain, America, India and throughout Europe, which defined the key characteristics of Britishness as strength and determination, adaptability, modesty and a sense of humour.

External links 
Daily Telegraph announcement

British awards